The Royal Military Infirmary (RMI) in Dublin was located at the southeastern edge of Phoenix Park (Páirc an Fhionnuisce), one of several former British military installations in the area. The hospital buildings are now part of the Irish Department of Defence's (An Roinn Cosanta) estate and currently houses Ireland's Office of the Director of Public Prosecutions (Oifig an Stiúrthóra Ionchúiseamh Poiblí - ODPP). The bulk of the British Army's medical services in Dublin were transferred from the RMI to a new hospital at Arbour Hill in Dublin in 1913. The Infirmary buildings are protected as they are nationally significant architecture.

History
The original RMI was designed by the English Architect James Gandon in the late Eighteenth Century. The executant architect for the building's construction was William Gibson, who did redesign some aspects of the building; the building's construction took place from 1786 to 1788. The original construction costs for the infirmary were recorded as £9000. Its design was seen as advanced and best in its class as a military hospital well after its inauguration.

The Infirmary's role was to take sick soldiers who could not be adequately dealt with by regimental hospitals in the various barracks of the Dublin Garrison. Between 1824 and 1825 the Infirmary was reconfigured as a military general hospital.

In 1806 the costs of the Infirmary and all other medical facilities in Ireland was costing the British Exchequer circa £15418. In 1835 soldier patients were expected to have some of their pay deducted to meet the running costs of the Infirmary.

Census returns of 31 March 1901 and 2 April 1911 show that the Infirmary was operating as a general hospital for the British Military.
However, the British Military had intended to close the hospital in 1911 on the completion of a new hospital which had been commenced in 1909 at Arbour Hill in Dublin. In 1910 the British Government had not decided on a purpose for the old hospital building In 1910 Lieutenant Colonel O Birt, was posted as the senior medical officer in charge of the Royal Military Infirmary. All proving that the Infirmary continued to function well beyond the date the British Government had anticipated. The Infirmary was certainly functioning as a hospital during World War 1.

The RMI and all other British Military installations fell under the direct control of the Irish Free State (Saorstát Éireann) in 1922 and the Department of Defence becoming the managing entity of the old Infirmary site and that remains the case to the present day. In 2007 there was a proposal to renovate the original Gandon building and adjacent annex and construct a subterranean annex to provide new office space for the relocation of the ODPP. This project did not take place as originally conceived.

Site Description
The Infirmary's foundation stone was laid in the presence of the then Lord Lieutenant of Ireland the Duke of Rutland on 17 August 1786. The original main three-storey building was designed with a C-shaped footprint; it was built of granite blocks faced with Portland stone. The main facade (circa 60 metres in width) faces south west on raised ground overlooking the southern entrance of Phoenix Park. This frontage includes a glazed cupola tower sat above a central clock face. Inside the original Infirmary there were 13 wards (six allocated to surgical and seven allocated to medical patients) were mainly located in the two rearward orientated wings; initially these wards could accommodate 187 beds. The central building span included offices, staff accommodation, chapel and other facilities.

See also
 Royal Hibernian Military School
 Magazine Fort
 Ordnance Survey Ireland

References

External links
 National Inventory of Architectural Heritage
 Curious Ireland The Irish Army Headquarters, Phoenix Park. Dublin City 1786
 the National Library of Ireland Catalogue - Royal Infirmary, Phoenix Park, Dublin

1788 establishments in Ireland
Former military buildings and structures
Phoenix Park
Hospitals in Dublin (city)
Buildings and structures in Dublin (city)
Hospitals established in the 1780s
Military history of Ireland
Defunct hospitals in the Republic of Ireland